is a Japanese film director, video artist, writer and documentary maker.

Life and career
Iwai was born in Sendai, Miyagi, Japan. He attended Yokohama National University, graduating in 1987.

In 1988 he started out in the Japanese entertainment industry by directing TV dramas and music videos. Then, in 1993, his TV drama, Fireworks, brought him critical praise and the Directors Guild of Japan New Directors Award for his portrayal of a group of children in the town of Iioka.

In 1995 he went on to start his career in feature films, starting with the box-office hit Love Letter, in which he cast pop singer Miho Nakayama in dual roles. Love Letter also launched the movie career of Miki Sakai who won a Japanese Academy Award as 'Newcomer of the Year' for her portrayal of Itsuki Fujii as a young girl. Iwai collaborated with cinematographer Noboru Shinoda to produce a film praised for its evocative winter cinematography. Love Letter made an impact in other east Asian countries too, notably South Korea where the film's success helped break down the post-World War II barriers to Japanese films being shown there.

In 1996 came the commercial and critical success of Swallowtail Butterfly, a multifaceted story of the fictional Yen Town, a city of immigrants in search of hope and a better life with three separate and distinct main characters. Ageha (Ayumi Ito), an orphaned teenage girl, Glico (Chara), a prostitute turned pop star, and Feihong (Hiroshi Mikami), an immigrant who manages Glico's career and owns the Yen Town club. He also wrote the lyrics of a theme song for the film Swallowtail Butterfly (Ai no Uta) with Chara and Takeshi Kobayashi.

In 1998, Fine Line Features released Love Letter in the United States theatrically under the new title When I Close My Eyes; it was the first Iwai-directed film to be released in the United States theatrically.

Iwai enjoyed another kind of success with this film as well, having teamed up with Takeshi Kobayashi to create the music for the film and the Yen Town Band, headed by Pop star Chara. The band they created became a commercial hit in Japan. He would team up with Kobayashi again in 2001 for the harrowing High School Drama All About Lily Chou-Chou. Kobayashi would create the music for the titular pop star, Lily Chou-Chou (voiced by Japanese singer Salyu), that is spread through the film (as well as Debussy), and later be released as an album entitled Kokyu (Breathe).

In 2002 he released a short, ARITA, in which he composed his own film score for the first time. In 2004 Iwai released Hana & Alice, his first comedy. He once again composed the film score himself.

He has recently directed a commercial airing in Japan featuring Matsu Takako, whom he has not worked with since 1998.

October 2006 sees the Iwai-produced film Rainbow Song released in Japan. The film is directed by Naoto Kumazawa and was written by Ami Sakurai. It stars previous Iwai actors Hayato Ichihara, Yū Aoi and Shoko Aida. Also in 2006, Iwai spent time documenting and interviewing Kon Ichikawa while filming The Inugamis (Inugamike no ichizoku - 2006) to create a feature-length documentary about the director's life.

A more recent project, a piece he wrote about the Japanese indie rock scene in the early 1990s called Bandage, was released on January 16, 2010. Apart from being in charge of the music production, "Bandage" represents Takeshi Kobayashi's first time as a movie director. The project was originally taken by Ryuhei Kitamura, but was dropped in 2006.  The filming started in 2008 and Kobayashi chose a completely different cast for the movie, casting j-pop singer Jin Akanishi and Kie Kitano for the main roles. It also included other actors who have worked with Iwai before, such as Ayumi Ito and Hideyuki Kasahara. The release of the horror film Vampire marked his English-language film debut.

Filmography

Film

Other

Awards
Unknown Child
 1991 - Galaxy Award, Dranma dos Award.

Fireworks
 1993 - Directors Guild of Japan New Directors Award

Undo
 1995 - Berlin International Film Festival, Forum of new cinema, Netpac Award.

Picnic
 1996 - Berlin International Film Festival, Forum of new cinema Prize of the Readers of the Berliner Zeitung.

Love Letter
 Montreal World Film Festival Audience Award.
 20th Houchi Cinema Award: Best Director.
 8th Nikkan Sports Movie Award: Best Newcomer.
 69th Kinema Junpo Best 10: Reader's poll for Directors.
 50th Mainichi Movie Competition: Best Japanese Movie.
 17th Yokohama Film Festival: Production Award, Director Award.
 21st Osaka Film Festival: Production Award, Best New Director.
 19th Academy Award in Japan: Best Production.
 6th ACA Film Award: Best Film Production.
 46th Arts Recommendations: Newcomer Award from the Ministry of Culture.
 10th Takasaki Film Festival: Grand Prix of young directors.

Swallowtail Butterfly
 1998 - Fant-Asia Film Festival, Best Asian Film.

April Story
 1998 - Pusan International Film Festival, Audience Award.

All About Lily Chou-Chou
 2002 - Berlin International Film Festival: The C.I.C.A.E. Panorama Prize.
 2002 - 6th Shanghai International Film Festival: Special Jury Award / Best Music.

Hana & Alice
 Best Actress: Yū Aoi, 2005 - Japanese Professional Movie Award

See also
Cinema of Japan

References

External links
 
 

1963 births
Japanese film directors
Japanese video artists
Living people
People from Sendai
Yokohama National University alumni